The Johnson Jakande Tinubu Park is a public park located close in Ikeja, Lagos. The park which was commissioned by the Lagos State Governor in December 2017, is a recreational space located within the proximity of The Office of the Governor, the Lagos State House of Assembly and the State Secretariat. The park is usually very busy during festive periods, but on a normal work day and during the weekends, residents and mostly workers within the environment visit the park to relax and recreate.

Gallery

References 

2017 establishments in Nigeria
Parks in Lagos